Ben Bulatao, ACE, is a Filipino-American television editor. He is best known for his work on Deadliest Catch, Coal, Jay Leno's Garage and Ice Road Truckers.

Bulatao's work on the Discovery Channel's docuseries, Deadliest Catch, has been nominated six times for the Primetime Emmy Award.

Life and Career
Benjamin Bulatao was born in Milton, Florida to Filipino immigrant parents. His father, Arsenio Bulatao was in the United States Navy.  His mother, Linda Pascua was a registered nurse. He graduated from Carson High School in Carson, California. Bulatao earned a B.S. in biological sciences from the University of California, Irvine. He is a member of American Cinema Editors (ACE). He was a board member of the Media Action Network for Asian Americans (MANAA). He marched with Jesse Jackson and the Rainbow Coalition at the 1996 Oscars on March 25, 1996. In 2022, Blogtalk with MJ Racadio named him one of the "75 Most Influential Filipino-Americans". He was ranked #10.

Bulatao has two children, Jet and Jordan, with his wife, Jennifer, and resides in Rancho Palos Verdes, California.

Selected filmography

Awards and nominations

References

External links
 

Living people
American television editors
Year of birth missing (living people)